Wasim Haider (born 6 June 1967, in Faisalabad) is a former Pakistani right arm fast medium bowler in cricket who played three One Day International matches during the 1992 Cricket World Cup and for PIA and Faisalabad.

References

External links 

1967 births
Living people
Pakistan One Day International cricketers
Cricketers at the 1992 Cricket World Cup
Faisalabad cricketers
Pakistan Railways cricketers
Pakistan International Airlines cricketers
Water and Power Development Authority cricketers
Cricketers from Faisalabad